The Greater Houston Partnership (GHP) is the largest chamber of commerce in the Houston area. The Partnership is an economic development organization for the Greater Houston area. The mission of the Greater Houston Partnership is to make Houston one of the world's best places to live, work and build a business. The Partnership works to make Houston greater by promoting economic development, foreign trade and investment, and by advocating for efficient and effective government that supports, rather than impedes, business growth. The Partnership also convenes key stakeholders to solve the region's most pressing issues. The Partnership was formed in 1989 in a merger of the Greater Houston Chamber of Commerce, the Houston Economic Development Council and the Houston World Trade Association. Today, the Partnership serves the 12-county greater Houston region and represents a member roster of 900 businesses and institutions. Members of the Partnership account for one-fifth of all jobs in Houston. They engage in various initiatives, committees and task forces to work toward our goal of making Houston greater.

History
The organization was established in 1989, when the Houston Chamber of Commerce, the Houston Economic Development Council, and the Houston World Trade Association merged. The Partnership's roots extend to the original Houston Chamber of Commerce's creation in 1840.

In 1992, the Partnership founded The Center for Houston's Future as a non-profit research organization. The Center for Houston's Future became an independent affiliate of the Greater Houston Partnership in 2000.

In 2007, the chamber came out in favor of a bond for Houston Independent School District (HISD), lending key support to the effort the month before the election. The bond was approved by the voters.

In 2019, the Greater Houston Partnership called for the Texas Education Agency to assign a board of managers to run HISD.

In 2021, the organization released a strategy for how Houston can leverage its energy leadership to accelerate global solutions for an energy-abundant, low-carbon future and launched the Houston Energy Transition Initiative (HETI).

The Partnership’s current Chair is Thad Hill.

Criticism 
In 2014, the Houston Chronicle criticized Greater Houston Partnership for refusing to comply with an open records request. To avoid disclosing the information requested, GHP chose to instead cancel contracts with the county government, drawing criticism from elected officials such as Harris County Precinct 3 Commissioner Steve Radack.

In January 2021, the organization received calls to denounce the January 6 riots at the US Capitol. 

In April 2021, advocacy groups and business voices called on the organization to oppose voter suppression legislation proposed by members of the Texas Legislature. 175 well-known members of the Houston business community, including ten GHP members, openly opposed the legislation. Two days later, Harris County Judge Lina Hidalgo and Houston Mayor Sylvester Turner pulled out of GHP luncheons in opposition to GHP's silence on the bills. The organization released another statement the next day "opposing voter suppression", but still took no position on the bills.

References

External links

Social Media Channels
Facebook
LinkedIn
Twitter
Instagram
TikTok

Organizations based in Houston
Economy of Houston